Richard Beals may refer to:

 Dick Beals (1927–2012), American voice actor
 Richard Beals (mathematician) (born 1938), American mathematician